The R188 is a class of new technology (NTT) New York City Subway cars built by Kawasaki Heavy Industries for the A Division. The R188 order also expanded the 7's fleet as part of the 7 Subway Extension, which opened in 2015.

Of the 506 cars in the fleet, only 126 were built brand-new; the remaining 380 cars were originally part of the R142A fleet that entered service in 2000, before being upgraded to R188s with the installation of CBTC equipment. The fleet first entered passenger service on November 9, 2013, and the final cars were delivered in June 2016.

Description
380 of the R188s are numbered 7211–7590, and the remaining 126 cars are numbered 7811–7936.

Cars 7211–7590 (380 cars) used to be R142As and were converted to R188s from 2010 to 2016, car numbers 7811–7898 (88 cars) are the new R188 cars built to supplement the increase in 7 service, and cars 7899–7936 (38 cars) are the new R188 "C" cars built to expand converted R142A sets from five cars to six cars (Most A-Division lines use 10-car trains, while the  use 11-car trains, necessitating the addition of one new car to convert the sets).

The R188 contract was divided into two sub-orders: 33 main order cars (7211–7220, 7811–7832, and 7899) and 473 option order cars (7221–7590, 7833–7898 and 7900–7936).

Currently, all R188s are maintained at the Corona Yard and assigned to the 7 and <7>.

Features

The R188s are equipped with the latest control systems, HVAC, and public address systems to guarantee the utmost safety and passenger comfort. They are visually very similar to the R142s and nearly identical to the R142As, but due to electrical incompatibilities, in addition to being equipped with CBTC, the three types are not interoperable. Therefore, these cars are compatible only with the converted R142As that feature CBTC.

Like the R142s, R142As, and R143s, the R188s feature the electronic strip map with all stops on the 7 route. The maps come with an indicator that can be set to either a local or express train.

Experimental features
This modification was done to make it easier for passengers to differentiate between an express or a local train. In the following year, car 7501 had the LCD destination indicator parts of its destination signs replaced with LED panels to make it aesthetically similar to the aforementioned route display. Cars 7505 and 7503 received the same modifications in mid-2019 and mid-2020, respectively. It is currently unknown if the remainder of the rolling stock will be retrofitted with these features.

In April 2017, car 7502 was equipped with a special test truck, replacing the original truck found on other cars.

In September 2018, cars 7847–7848 were fitted with new LCD advertisement screens, replacing the traditional paper advertisements that are usually located there.

History

Timeline of contracts

At the time that the R188 order was placed, 40 eleven-car sets of R62As were assigned to the 7 service. The R188 order originally consisted of 186 new cars, as well as 131 converted R142A cars compatible with communication-based train control (CBTC) and an additional 189 R142A conversion kits for the MTA, totaling a possible 506 cars, or 46 eleven-car trains. Of these 506 cars, 230 are arranged in five-car sets while the remaining 276 are arranged in six-car sets. Six extra R188 trainsets were ordered in conjunction with CBTC installation and 7 Subway Extension. The trains are configured so that the five-car consist on each train is located on the Manhattan-bound end and the six-car consist is located on the Main Street-bound end, due to the position of conductor's boards on platforms along the 7 route.

According to the 2010–2014 capital plan, 146 new cars were to be purchased. Of these new cars, 110 cars would go to make up 10 new eleven-car trains, while the remaining 36 cars were to be "C" cars that would go to expanding 36 CBTC upgraded R142A five-car sets (360 existing cars) to six-car lengths. The original planned total of 46 eleven-car trains (506 cars) would still result from this order.

In the latest revision, however, only 88 new cars were to be purchased to form 8 new eleven-car trains, with 38 "C" cars, rather than 10 eleven-car trains. Likewise, the number of conversion cars was altered to 370. This change was made because only two sets of ten-car R62As were needed for fleet expansion of the mainline IRT, as opposed to the previously projected four sets, and thus the MTA and Kawasaki opted to convert two additional R142A train sets instead of manufacturing two new sets. The MTA also decided to have Kawasaki perform all of the conversions at the Yonkers plant instead of 207th Street Shop as part of that contract modification.

The R188 contract was awarded in spring 2010 to Kawasaki Heavy Industries, who won by default since only two manufacturers qualified, and Bombardier Transportation opted not to bid on the contract, citing the small order and large requirement for engineering resources. The contract was specified at $87,094,272 for the base order, which consisted of 33 cars (23 new cars and 10 conversions), and $384,315,168 for the option order, which consisted of 473 cars (123 new cars, and 350 conversions) for a total price of $471,409,440.

Delivery

According to a February 2012 update, the MTA had expected to have 8 conversion sets in service by the time that the 7 Subway Extension is opened for revenue service. In addition, the breakdown of the trainsets has been disclosed. Operationally, the R188s are coupled as such: 

where dashes signify link bars, and the addition sign denotes couplers. Thirty-eight R142A B cars, therefore, were converted into R188 "C" cars, in addition to the 38 deliveries of new "C" cars (not including the "C" cars in the eight new 11-car sets).

The 10 converted R142A cars from the base order (7211–7220) were completed in December 2011 at Kawasaki's Yonkers facility and were delivered for testing on the Flushing Line in 2012. The 23 new R188 cars from the base order (two eleven-car sets, 7811–7832, and one conversion set "C" car, 7899) were completed in mid-2012, delivered in November 2013, and entered service in December 2013. The 66 new option cars (7833–7898) were also completed in mid-2012 and have been delivered, while the remaining 37 new cars and the 370 conversions were set to be converted and delivered from February 2014 until the 4th quarter of 2015.

On November 9, 2013, the first R188 train, consisting of cars 7811–7821, was placed in service on the 7 train as part of its 30-day revenue acceptance test. After successful completion, it entered revenue service by December 15, 2013. 
By July 2014, the delivery schedule had slipped by about 6–7 months. However, delivery of the cars sped up; all remaining R188 cars were expected to be delivered by the end of July 2016, but the last R188 cars were delivered on June 14, 2016. By July 22, 2016 all R188s were in service.

In popular culture
In January 2020, as part of an agreement between the MTA and Comedy Central to promote actress Awkwafina's TV show Nora From Queens, the default pre-recorded announcements on the R188s were replaced with those from Awkwafina for one week. The announcements from Awkwafina featured jokes in addition to the standard station announcements. The agreement was the first time that the MTA has replaced train announcements as a form of advertising.

In September 2022, New York Mets television broadcast announcers Ron Darling, Keith Hernandez, and Gary Cohen pre-recorded announcements along the 7 line.

Notes

References

External links

nycsubway.org - NYC Subway Cars: R188

Car Status/Assignment

R188
Kawasaki multiple units